Bernd Bergmair (also spelled Bernard Bergemar, born 1968 in Linz) is an Austrian businessman. He is one of the majority owners of privately held MindGeek, the Luxembourg-based conglomerate behind popular porn sites such as Pornhub. Although he is not mentioned in the company's corporate filings, a report by the Financial Times revealed that Bergemar is MindGeek's largest beneficiary thanks to a "complex network of subsidiaries" in which he owns a large percentage of the shares.

Early life 
He grew up as the son of farmers in  Ansfelden, attended grammar school in Linz and transferred to HLBLA St. Florian. He then studied at the University of Linz, graduating in 1992 with a thesis on a topic related to corporate acquisition: Evaluation of corporations and financing strategies in connection with M & A, LBO and MBO. He worked for Goldman Sachs in New York, before working in Frankfurt am Main, Hong Kong and London. In 2006 he became the owner of the porn website RedTube and in 2013 he sold the site to Manwin, now known as Mindgeek.

MindGeek 
In December 2020, the Financial Times published a report on MindGeek's ownership, revealing that Bergmair or "Bernard Bergemar" as he had used in court documents was the company's majority owner. The Financial Times report prompted a parliamentary inquiry into Pornhub's practices in Canada, in which MindGeek directors and minority owners David Tassillo and Feras Antoon named a "Bernard Bergemar" as the principal owner. He owned more than half of the shares, but was a passive investor and not involved in the day-to-day business. British research platform Tortoise Media and Austrian magazine Dossier cooperated on an investigation.

Company records showed Bergemar lived in China, but was found to be actually living in a mansion in London after the investigation by Tortoise Media. Soon after, his Brazilian wife Priscila Bergmair told The Sunday Times that she wanted her husband to cut ties with the company.

References 

1968 births
Living people
People from Linz-Land District
British pornographers
Johannes Kepler University Linz alumni
Goldman Sachs people